The Long Distance Walkers Association (LDWA) is a British not for profit, volunteer-led association whose aim is "to further the common interests of those who enjoy long distance walking". The LDWA is an association of people with the common interest of walking long distances in rural, urban, mountainous, coastal or moorland areas. The LDWA is recognised as the sports governing body for the discipline of "long distance walking" in England, Wales and Scotland.

Activities

The LDWA has over 40 local groups which organise walks for their members, and publishes a journal Strider three times a year.

Walks fall into two categories:
Social walks (also referred to as group walks) are normally led walks of anything up to 30 miles in length and recorded on the social walk database available to members.
Challenge events are normally between 20 and 100 miles, self-led (participants navigate the route based on written instructions) and must generally be completed within a defined time limit. Challenge events are marshalled: participants must call in at clipper points or checkpoints to get a tally card punched to show they are following the route.

The annual "Hundred" event, is the LDWA's flagship event. Held every year in a different part of the country, to coincide with the late May bank holiday, up to 500 people gather to walk 100 miles in 48 hours. In order to enter all these people will have completed a qualifying event beforehand. The first 100-mile event held was the Downsman 100 in 1973. There have been two years without a hundred-mile event: 2001 when foot and mouth closed the countryside, and 2020 when COVID-19 prevented the event taking place. COVID-19 also affected the 2021 event which was run as the Sir Fynwy virtual 100.

The LDWA has the most comprehensive database on long-distance paths is the UK. Access is available to members and non-members alike, with members receiving additional benefits for example unlimited downloadable GPX files of routes.

See also
Hiking
Walking in the United Kingdom

References

External links

Strider, the official publication of the LDWA

Hiking organizations
Clubs and societies in the United Kingdom
Walking in the United Kingdom
Organizations established in 1972
1972 establishments in the United Kingdom
Long distance travel